The Gambler is a 1974 American crime drama film written by James Toback and directed by Karel Reisz. It stars James Caan, Paul Sorvino and Lauren Hutton. 
Caan's performance was widely lauded and was nominated for a Golden Globe.

Plot
Axel Freed is an English professor in New York City with a gambling addiction that begins to spiral out of control. In the classroom, Freed inspires his college students with his interpretations of Fyodor Dostoevsky's work. In his personal life, Axel has the affection of the beautiful Billie and the admiration of his family, including his mother, Naomi, who is a doctor, and his grandfather, a wealthy businessman.

Axel's gambling has left him with a huge debt. His bookie, a mafioso known as Hips, likes the professor personally but threatens grave consequences if he does not pay it soon. When Billie, having been informed by Axel that he owes $44,000, questions the wisdom of her associating with him, Axel confidently tells her she loves his life's dangers, including "the possibility of blood".

After obtaining the $44,000 from his disapproving mother, Axel goes with Billie to Las Vegas and gambles it into a small fortune, only to lose back his last $50,000 on a last-second, incredibly-lucky shot in a Laker game.

Having subsequently won $12,000 on a fixed Laker-game gift from another gambler and paid it to the bookmaker, Axel is abducted by associates of the latter.  The boss asks Axel if he has family who might help him pay.  Axel mentions his grandfather and mother. The boss says he’d asked the grandfather who said no.

Acting on an offer from the mob, Axel lures one of his students, a star on the college's basketball team, to shave points in his next game, so the mob can bet big on the game to cover Axel's debt. The student accepts Axel's offer of $5,000 for the illicit play. Having set that up, Axel visits his grandfather, who, near the end of their conversation, asks if Axel needs his help.  Saying he’s taken care of it, Axel leaves.

Watching the game from the stands with three of the mob's bookmakers, Axel is saved by the bribed player's final-minutes' point-shaving, which enables the team to win by only 6 and thus not cover a 7-point spread. Nixing a night of post-game celebration with Hips, Axel wanders off into a neighboring black ghetto, as Hips warns him the place is a "jungle."

At a ghetto bar, Axel meets a prostitute, and they go to an upstairs room of a hotel.  Threatened by her pimp after refusing to pay her when she refuses to take off all her clothes, Axel eggs the pimp to cut him with his switchblade. The pimp, thinking Axel crazy, backs off, and Axel repeatedly punches him, knocks him to the floor, and kicks him over and over. Frantic, the prostitute picks up the fallen blade and slashes Axel across the face.

Bleeding from his facial wound, Axel staggers down the stairs, looks at himself in a mirror, and smiles enigmatically at his slashed cheek.

Cast

 James Caan as Axel Freed
 Paul Sorvino as Hips
 Lauren Hutton as Billie
 Morris Carnovsky as A.R. Lowenthal
 Jacqueline Brookes as Naomi Freed
 Burt Young as Carmine
 Carmine Caridi as Jimmy
 Vic Tayback as One
 Steven Keats as Howie
 London Lee as Monkey
 M. Emmet Walsh as Las Vegas Gambler
 James Woods as Bank Officer
 Carl W. Crudup as Spencer
 Allan Rich as Bernie
 Stuart Margolin as Cowboy
 Ric Mancini as Sal
 Beatrice Winde as Hospital Receptionist
 Antonio Fargas as Pimp
 Richard Foronjy as Donny
 Frank Sivero as Donny's Driver
 Frank Adonis as Man in Park with Donny
 Philip Sterling as Sidney
 Patricia Fay as Bank Teller

Production
The film was the first produced screenplay by James Toback. Toback had worked as an English lecturer at the City College of New York and had a gambling problem. He originally wrote The Gambler as a semi-autobiographical novel but halfway through started envisioning it as a film and turned it into a screenplay.

Toback completed it in 1972 and showed it to his friend Lucy Saroyan, who introduced Toback to Robert De Niro. Toback became enthused about the possibility of De Niro playing the lead. He showed the script to his literary agent who gave it to Mike Medavoy who attached director Karel Reisz. Reisz did not want to use De Niro and cast James Caan instead.

"Caan became a great Axel Freed, although obviously different from the character De Niro would have created", wrote Toback later. It was filmed at a time when leading actor James Caan was battling his own addiction to cocaine. Caan says the film is one of his favorites. "It's not easy to make people care about a guy who steals from his mother to pay gambling debts."

Some see the film as a loose adaptation of the short 1866 novel The Gambler by Fyodor Dostoyevsky.

Reception
Roger Ebert awarded his top grade of four stars and wrote that the film "begins as a portrait of Axel Freed's personality, develops into the story of his world, and then pays off as a thriller. We become so absolutely contained by Axel's problems and dangers that they seem like our own." Vincent Canby of The New York Times was less impressed, writing, "The movie follows Axel's downward path with such care that you keep thinking there must be some illuminating purpose, but there isn't ... Mr. Reisz and Mr. Toback reportedly worked a couple of years putting the screenplay into this shape, which is lifeless." Gene Siskel of the Chicago Tribune gave the film three-and-a-half stars out of four and said that director Karel Reisz "is most successful in presenting Axel as a true sickie and his adversaries as genuinely ruthless. The latter is no mean feat, inasmuch as ruthless movie mobsters are a dime-a-dozen in these post-'Godfather' days ... We know that the film is a success, because it doesn't really matter whether Axel is a winner or a loser as the film ends. 'The Gambler' is a personality study, and like 'California Split,' its story does not hang on its ending." Arthur D. Murphy of Variety called The Gambler "way ahead as the better of two current films about the gambling compulsion. Director Karel Reisz has one of his most compelling and effective films. Title star James Caan is excellent and the featured players are superb." Charles Champlin of the Los Angeles Times declared it "a cool, hard, perfectly cut gem of a movie, as brilliant and mysteriously deep as a fine diamond. At its center is an hypnotically absorbing performance, at once charming and dismaying, by James Caan, who must certainly have an Academy Award nomination for it." Pauline Kael of The New Yorker stated, "At 'The Gambler,' we're trapped at a maniacal lecture on gambling as existential expression. And, as almost always happens when a movie is predictable and everything is analyzed and labelled, the actions and the explanations aren't convincing. Gambling is too easy a metaphor for life; as metaphor, it belongs to the world of hardboiled fiction." Gary Arnold of The Washington Post agreed, calling it "a well-made movie invalidated at every turn by a script with big, literary pretensions but little if any dramatic credibility." Jonathan Rosenbaum of The Monthly Film Bulletin wrote that his problem with the film "is not so much a surfeit of psychological analysis—the script offers hints, not explicit causes explaining Axel's condition—as too little to account for his behaviour naturalistically, and too much to permit any sustained acceptance of the character on an allegorical or mythical level ... there is nothing in Axel that suggests hidden depths; indeed, despite Caan's consistent professionalism, the actor seems to be as disinterested in his character as Axel seems to be in himself." Filmink  said the film was "peak ‘70s Caan with the star at his swaggering charming curly haired best."

The film holds a score of 80% on Rotten Tomatoes based on 10 reviews.

Remake

In August 2011, Paramount Pictures announced a remake of the 1974 film The Gambler with the original producers, Irwin Winkler and Robert Chartoff. Intended as a new directorial project for Martin Scorsese, it was reported that Leonardo DiCaprio was attached as the star and William Monahan would write the screenplay.

In a 2011 interview, screenwriter James Toback gave the story of the original film's autobiographical background and development, and criticized the announcement of the remake.

Scorsese left the project and filmmaker Todd Phillips was in talks to take over as of August 2012.

In September 2013, Mark Wahlberg and director Rupert Wyatt expressed interest in remaking the film. The film was released on December 25, 2014.

See also
 List of American films of 1974

References

External links
 

1974 films
1974 crime drama films
American crime drama films
Films set in 1974
Films directed by Karel Reisz
Films set in the Las Vegas Valley
Films set in New York City
Films about the American Mafia
Films shot in the Las Vegas Valley
Films shot in New York City
Films about gambling
Paramount Pictures films
Films produced by Robert Chartoff
Films produced by Irwin Winkler
Films scored by Jerry Fielding
1970s English-language films
1970s American films